Sweat of the brow is an intellectual property law doctrine that is chiefly related to copyright law. According to this doctrine, an author gains rights through simple diligence during the creation of a work, such as a database, or a directory. Substantial creativity or "originality" is not required.

Under a "sweat of the brow" doctrine, the creator of a work, even if it is completely unoriginal, is entitled to have that effort and expense protected; no one else may use such a work without permission, but must instead recreate the work by independent research or effort. The classic example is a telephone directory. In a "sweat of the brow" jurisdiction, such a directory may not be copied, but instead a competitor must independently collect the information to issue a competing directory. The same rule generally applies to databases and lists of facts.

According to the Databases Directive 96/9/EC, member states of the EU are obliged to confer protection known as the database right on non-original databases, that is on those that embody no creativity, but are a consequence of substantial investment (financial, labour etc.).

Etymology
In a traditional English idiom, the sweat of one's brow refers to the effort expended in labour, and the value created thereby. The law doctrine takes its name from this idiom.

By territory

United States

The United States rejected this doctrine in the 1991 United States Supreme Court case Feist Publications v. Rural Telephone Service; until then it had been upheld in a number of US copyright cases.

Under the Feist ruling in the US, mere collections of facts are considered unoriginal and thus not protected by copyright, no matter how much work went into collating them. The arrangement and presentation of a collection may be original, but not if it is "simple and obvious" such as a list in alphabetical or chronological order.

United Kingdom
Under the Copyright, Designs and Patents Act 1988 (CDPA), for copyright to subsist in a work, that work must be original. However, courts have not adopted a literal reading of this requirement. For over a hundred years, English courts have held that a significant expenditure of labour is sufficient. The consequence of this is that if A makes a work in which copyright subsists, and B subsequently adds his skill, judgement and labour, altering the form of A's work, B will potentially have a copyright in the work he produces. This suggests that copyright is not about protecting ideas, because one can acquire a copyright by expending skill, labour, and judgement, but no creativity or inventiveness.

However, in March 2012, a case was taken to the European Court of Justice, in which Football DataCo claimed copyright infringement over web sites which were reproducing match schedules from several major football leagues. Football DataCo asserted that these schedules were copyrighted works due to the skill and labour involved in their preparation, and that the company was given exclusive rights to license their reproduction. Based on its interpretation of British law, the court rejected the notion that labour and skill was enough to grant protection to a work, since "unless the procedures for creating the lists concerned as described by the national court are supplemented by elements reflecting originality in the selection or arrangement of the data contained in those lists, they do not suffice for those lists to be protected by the copyright laid down in the directive."

In a copyright notice on "digital images, photographs and the internet" last updated in November 2015, the UK Intellectual Property Office stated that digital reproductions of public domain images are not protected by copyright, arguing that "according to the Court of Justice of the European Union which has effect in UK law, copyright can only subsist in subject matter that is original in the sense that it is the author's own "intellectual creation". Given this criterion, it seems unlikely that what is merely a retouched, digitised image of an older work can be considered as "original"."

Examples
In Walter v Lane (1900) (pre-CDPA), reporters took shorthand notes of a speech, punctuated them, etc. and published them in the Times newspaper. The court held that the reporters were authors of the published speech, and, as such, owned a copyright in the published speeches, because of the considerable skill, labour, and judgement they exercised.

In University of London Press Ltd v University Tutorial Press Ltd (1916), the question arose as to whether certain mathematics exam papers were original literary works. The exam papers just consisted of conventional maths problems in a conventional manner. The court held that originality does not mean that the work must be an expression of individual thought. The simple fact that the authors drew on a body of knowledge common to mathematicians did not compromise originality. The requirement of originality, it was held, does not require that expression be in an original or novel form. It does, however, require that the work not be copied from another work. It must originate from the author.
As such, even though these were the same old maths problems every student is familiar with, and even though there was no creative input, the skill, labour, and judgement of the authors was sufficient to make the papers original literary works.

In Cummins v Bond (1927), a psychic in a trance claimed to have written down what spirits told her, through a process of automatic writing. In court, she accepted that she was not the creative author of the writing. The creative input, had, presumably, come from the spirits. Nonetheless, the court held that she had exercised sufficient labour and skill in translating and transcribing what the spirits told her, so she had a copyright in the resulting literary work.

In 2013, Ministry of Sound sued the subscription music-streaming service Spotify over user-created playlists mimicking the track listings of their compilation albums, alleging that they infringed the copyright of the albums themselves due to the skill and effort in their creation. The parties settled in 2014 without going to trial.

Germany
Prior to 2021, German law granted ancillary copyrights (Leistungsschutzrecht) due to the effort involved in the production or exploitation of creative works. In 2016, a regional court in Berlin ruled that digitized versions of public domain paintings were entitled to new copyrights due to the effort and expertise necessary to create the reproductions. The case was appealed. In 2018 a court upheld the decision that the digitized public domain paintings were entitled to new copyrights. In 2021, Germany implemented Article 14 of the Directive on Copyright in the Digital Single Market. Germany's implementation law specified that reproductions of visual works in the public domain are not protected by copyright or related rights.

European Union
In 2019, the European Union adopted the Directive on Copyright in the Digital Single Market. Article 14 of the directive states that reproductions of works of visual art that are in the public domain cannot be subject to copyright or related rights, unless the reproduction is an original creative work.

Israel
Israeli law requires that a work exhibit some degree of originality in order to be copyrightable. In other words, Israeli law does not subscribe to the "sweat of the brow" doctrine. However, the amount of originality required is minimal, and the transliteration or interpretation of an artifact is covered by copyright.

See also
Copyfraud
Fair use (complement to avoid abuses)
Lockean Classical liberalism
Labour theory of value
Database right
Sweat equity
Threshold of originality

References

Intellectual property law
Copyright law